Vauchamps may refer to the following places in France:

 Vauchamps, Doubs, a commune in the Doubs department
 Vauchamps, Marne, a commune in the Marne department